Eucalyptus malacoxylon, commonly known as Moonbi apple box or apple box, is a species of small to medium-sized tree that is endemic to a restricted area of New South Wales. It has rough, fibrous or flaky bark on the trunk and larger branches, smooth bark on the thinnest branches, lance-shaped adult leaves, flower buds in groups of seven, white flowers and cup-shaped, conical or hemispherical fruit.

Description

Taxonomy and naming
Eucalyptus malacoxylon was first formally described in 1934 by William Blakely who published the description in his book A Key to the Eucalypts. The specific epithet (malacoxylon) is derived from the ancient Greek words malakos meaning "soft" and xylon meaning "wood".

Distribution and habitat
Moonbi apple box grows in open woodland on sloping ground in soils derived from granite. It only occurs from an area between Bendemeer, Nundle and Niangala at the southern end of the Northern Tablelands.

References

malacoxylon
Myrtales of Australia
Flora of New South Wales
Trees of Australia
Plants described in 1934
Taxa named by William Blakely